Holebaagilu is situated on the banks of the Sharavati River about 30 km from Sagar, Karnataka. Drivers have to take a diversion from B. H. Road towards Ikkeri Road to get there. The Sharavati backwaters of Linganamakki dam has submerged acres of land. It is in Kolur Grama Panchayat limits. One has to take a flatboat to get across the backwaters to reach the other side where Sigandooru is.

Sagara, Karnataka
Beaches of Karnataka
Geography of Shimoga district